Gilbert Pickering (fl. 1318) was an English politician.

He was a Member (MP) of the Parliament of England for Bristol in 1318.

References

Year of birth missing
14th-century deaths
English MPs 1318
Members of the Parliament of England for Bristol